Molly is a 1999 romantic comedy-drama film about a 28-year-old woman with autism who comes into the custody of her neurotic executive brother. The film was directed by John Duigan and written by Dick Christie of Small Wonder-fame, and stars Elisabeth Shue as the title character, Aaron Eckhart as her older brother, and Jill Hennessy.

Plot 
A 28-year-old autistic woman named Molly McKay has lived in a mental institution from a young age following her parents' deaths in an automobile accident. When the institution must close on account of budget cuts, Molly is left in the care of her non-autistic older brother, Buck McKay, an advertising executive and perennial bachelor. Molly, who verbalizes very little and is obsessed with lining up her shoes in neat rows, throws Buck's life into a tailspin as she runs off her nurses and barges into a meeting at Buck's agency naked.

Molly's neurologist, Susan Brookes, suggests an experimental surgery in which genetically modified brain cells are implanted into Molly's brain. While Buck initially balks at the suggestion, he finally consents to the surgery and Molly makes a gradual but miraculous recovery, speaking fluidly and interacting with others in a normal way. Buck begins taking Molly to social events, like a production of Romeo and Juliet, a baseball game, and expensive dinners. However, after a few months, Molly's brain begins to reject the transplanted cells and she begins to regress into her previous state. Both Molly and Buck must accept the eventual loss of Molly's cure and her regression into her previous state.

In the final scene of the film, Buck accepts Molly's autism and vows to remain in Molly's life by creating a room for her at his home that looks just like the room she had at the institution.

Cast
 Elisabeth Shue as Molly McKay
 Lauren Richter as 7-year-old Molly McKay
 Aaron Eckhart as Buck McKay
 Tanner Lee Prairie as 8-year-old Buck McKay
 Jill Hennessy as Susan Brookes
 Thomas Jane as Sam
 D. W. Moffett as Mark Cottrell
 Elizabeth Mitchell as Beverly Trehare
 Robert Harper as Dr. Simmons
 Elaine Hendrix as Jennifer Thomas
 Michael Paul Chan as Domingo
 Lucy Liu as Brenda
 Jon Pennell as Gary McKay
 Sarah Wynter as Julie McKay
 Jay Acovone as Jack, The Bartender

Release
The film earned US$17,650 during its theatrical run, on a budget of $21 million, making it a box office bomb. Believing the film was unlikely to be a success, the distributors Metro-Goldwyn-Mayer chose to cut their losses and eliminate the film's marketing budget. It was only released on a single weekend in twelve cinemas, in order to meet legal obligations.

Critical reception
Molly received mostly mixed to negative reviews from critics. On Rotten Tomatoes, the film holds a 14% "Rotten" approval from film critics, with a rating average of 3.4 out of 10. The consensus says, "Molly never really elevates above uninspired, cliche-ridden moments." At Metacritic, Molly received a weighted mean rating of 21 out of 100 from film critics, consistently indicating "generally unfavorable reviews", classified as a generally unfavorably reviewed film.

See also 
 Charly
 Rain Man

References

External links 
 
 
 
 Trailer

1999 films
1990s English-language films
1999 comedy-drama films
1999 romantic comedy-drama films
American romantic comedy-drama films
Films about autism
Films directed by John Duigan
Films scored by Trevor Jones
Metro-Goldwyn-Mayer films
1990s American films
Films about disability